Laura Malcolm (born 20 May 1991) is an English netball player who has been a co-captain of the national team. At club level, she plays for Mainland Tactix in the ANZ Premiership, and has previously played for Netball Superleague teams Manchester Thunder and Severn Stars.

Club career
Malcolm has played for Manchester Thunder and Severn Stars. She won the 2014 Netball Superleague with Manchester Thunder. Malcolm joined Severn Stars from Thunder in 2017, before returning to Thunder ahead of the 2019 season. She was part of the Thunder team that won the 2019 Netball Superleague. She was named in the 2021 Netball Superleague Team of the Year. In September 2021, Malcolm signed a new two-year contract with Manchester Thunder. 

In June 2022, Malcolm announced that she was leaving Manchester Thunder to play overseas. That month, she signed for New Zealand team Mainland Tactix ahead of the 2023 ANZ Premiership season.

International career
Malcolm made her debut for the England national netball team in a 2012 match against Barbados. She had previously been in the England squad for the 2011 World Netball Series.

In 2019, she was appointed vice-captain for the England tour of South Africa, and was also vice-captain for the 2020 Netball Nations Cup. She was named co-captain alongside Serena Guthrie for the 2020 Taini Jamison Trophy Series. As of March 2021, she had made 31 appearances for England. Malcolm was included in the England squad for the netball event at the 2022 Commonwealth Games.

Personal life
Malcolm runs her own netball coaching business, Maias Netball. During the COVID-19 pandemic in the United Kingdom, she taught many sessions online. She believes that people should be judged on merits rather than the colour of their skin. Malcolm's father died in 2013.

Notes

References

External links
 Netball Superleague Profile
 England Netball Profile

1991 births
Living people
English netball players
Manchester Thunder players
Severn Stars players
Black British sportswomen
Netball players at the 2022 Commonwealth Games
Netball Superleague players
Mainland Tactix players